is a Japanese politician of the Democratic Party of Japan, a member of the House of Councillors in the Diet (national legislature).

Overview 

A native of Kōriyama, Fukushima and graduate of Waseda University, he ran unsuccessfully for the House of Representatives in 1986 after serving in the assembly of Fukushima Prefecture for one term since 1983. He ran again in 1990 and was elected for the first time. After losing his seat in 1996, he ran unsuccessfully in 2000 but was elected in 2003. He lost his seat again in 2005. In 2007, he was elected, this time to the House of Councillors, for the first time.

References

External links 
 Official website in Japanese.

1947 births
Living people
Politicians from Fukushima Prefecture
Waseda University alumni
Members of the House of Representatives (Japan)
Members of the House of Councillors (Japan)
Democratic Party of Japan politicians
21st-century Japanese politicians